The women's SUP race competition at the 2022 Pan American Surf Games was held at Playa Venao in Pedasí District, Panama on 10 August 2022.

The race had been originally scheduled to be held on 12 August, however, it was moved up to 10 July.

Brazilian Lena Guimarães won the gold medal with a time of 42:12.04.

Results
Competitors had 60 minutes to complete the course. The results were as follows:

References

2022 Pan American Surf Games
Women's surfing